Remix City, Volume 1 is a remix album by American R&B singer, R. Kelly & it was released on November 15, 2005, through Jive Records and Zomba Label Group. Unlike Kelly's first greatest hits release, The R. in R&B Collection, Vol. 1 (2003), this album features remixed versions of his greatest hits.

Track listing 
Slow Dance (Hey Mr. DJ) / After The Party's Over (Singin' Remix) (R. Kelly, T. Blatcher, M. Jefferson)
Sex Me (Part II) (Extended Street Version) (R. Kelly)
Bump n' Grind (Old School Mix) (R. Kelly)
Your Body's Callin' (His & Hers Extended Remix) (featuring Aaliyah) (R. Kelly)
I Can't Sleep Baby (If I) (Remix Radio Version) (R. Kelly)
Down Low (Nobody Has To Know) (Live To Regret It/Blame It On The Mo Mix) [featuring Ronald Isley] (R. Kelly)
I Wish (To The Homies That We Lost Remix) [featuring Boo & Gotti] (R. Kelly)
Feelin' On Yo Booty (Hypnosis Mix) (R. Kelly)
I Mean (I Don't Mean It) (R. Kelly)
Ignition (Remix) (R. Kelly)
Step In The Name Of Love (Remix) (R. Kelly)
Slow Wind (Remix) (featuring Sean Paul & Akon) (R. Kelly, S.P. Henriques, A. Thiam)
Burn It Up (Remix) (featuring Fat Joe, Wisin & Yandel) (R. Kelly, F. Saldana, V. Cabrera, Wisin & Yandel, J. Cartagena)
Feelin' On Yo Booty (Dirty South Mix) (featuring YoungBloodZ) (R. Kelly, S. Joseph, J. Grigsby)

References

R. Kelly albums
Albums produced by R. Kelly
2006 remix albums
Jive Records remix albums
Albums produced by Luny Tunes